Chase Gormley (born August 11, 1983) is an American mixed martial artist in the Heavyweight division. A professional competitor since 2007, he has competed for the UFC, Bellator, the MFC, the RFA, King of the Cage, the XFC, Absolute Championship Berkut, and Titan FC, where he was Heavyweight Champion.

Background
Born and raised in Torrance, California, Gormley began training in MMA at the age of 13. A wrestler at Torrance High School, he continued at Montana State University - Northern, before transferring to Lindenwood University, where he was a NAIA All-American.

Mixed martial arts career

Early career
Gormley made his professional mixed martial arts debut in April 2007. He defeated his first six opponents, before his stint with the UFC.

Ultimate Fighting Championship
Gormley was expected to face Ben Rothwell at Affliction: Trilogy on August 1, 2009. However, the bout was moved to UFC 104, on October 24, after Affliction Entertainment ceased operations. As a result of a number of bouts being shuffled, Gormley's opponent was changed to Stefan Struve. Gormley lost the fight due to a triangle choke submission in the first round.

Gormley faced journeyman Brendan Schaub at UFC Live: Vera vs. Jones on March 21, 2010. He lost the fight via TKO in the first round. After the loss to Schaub, he was subsequently released from the UFC.

Bellator MMA
In July 2015, Bellator revealed that they had signed Gormley to an exclusive, multi-fight contract.

In his promotional debut, Gormley was defeated by Dan Charles at Bellator 143 on September 25, 2015, via knockout in the second round.

Gormley faced Joey Beltran at Bellator 155 on May 20, 2016. He won the fight via split decision.

Gormley faced Bobby Brents at Bellator 162 on October 21, 2016. He won the fight via split decision.

In the last fight of his Bellator contract, Gormley faced Sergei Kharitonov at Bellator 175 on March 31, 2017. He lost the fight via knock out in the first round.

Personal life
Prior to becoming a fighter, Gormley worked as a personal trainer.

Championships and accomplishments

Mixed martial arts
Titan Fighting Championship
Titan FC Heavyweight Championship (One time)
Gladiator Challenge
Gladiator Challenge Heavyweight Championship (One time)

Mixed martial arts record

|-
|Loss
|align=center|14–9 (1)
|Konstantin Andreitsev
|KO (punches)
|League S-70 - Plotforma S-70: 2018
|
|align=center|3
|align=center|2:56
|Sochi, Russia
|
|-
|Loss
|align=center|14–8 (1)
|Tanner Boser
|Decision (unanimous)
|ACB 88: Barnatt vs. Celiński
|
|align=center|3
|align=center|5:00
|Brisbane, Australia
|
|-
|Loss
|align=center|14–7 (1)
|Denis Goltsov
|KO (punch)
|ACB 77: Abdulvakhabov vs. Vartanyan 2 
|
|align=center| 2
|align=center| 2:16
|Moscow, Russia
|
|-
|Loss
|align=center|14–6 (1)
|Sergei Kharitonov
|KO (punch)
|Bellator 175
|
|align=center| 1
|align=center| 3:55
|Rosemont, Illinois, United States
|
|-
|Win
|align=center|14–5 (1)
|Bobby Brents
|Decision (split)
|Bellator 162
|
|align=center| 3
|align=center| 5:00
|Memphis, Tennessee, United States
|
|-
|Win
|align=center|13–5 (1)
|Joey Beltran
|Decision (split)
|Bellator 155
|
|align=center| 3
|align=center| 5:00
|Boise, Idaho, United States
|
|-
|Loss
|align=center|12–5 (1)
|Dan Charles
|KO (punch)
|Bellator 143
|
|align=center|2
|align=center|4:35
|Hidalgo, Texas, United States
|
|-
|Win
|align=center|12–4 (1)
|Jon Madsen
|Decision (unanimous)
|Titan Fighting Championships 33
|
|align=center|5
|align=center|5:00
|Mobile, Alabama, United States
|
|-
|Win
|align=center|11–4 (1)
|Dale Sopi
|Decision (unanimous)
|RFA 21: Juusola vs. Baghdad
|
|align=center|3
|align=center|5:00
|Costa Mesa, California, United States
|
|-
|Win
|align=center|10–4 (1)
|Tony Lopez
|TKO (knee injury)
|LOP: Chaos at the Casino 5
|
|align=center|3
|align=center|4:21
|Inglewood, California, United States
|
|-
|Win
|align=center|9–4 (1)
|Abdumonim Adoli
|TKO (punches)
|Gladiator Fighting Championship 6
|
|align=center|1
|align=center|0:38
|Kuwait City, Kuwait
|
|-
|Win
|align=center|8–4 (1)
|Brandon Sayles
|Decision (unanimous)
|XFC 16: High Stakes
|
|align=center|3
|align=center|5:00
|Knoxville, Tennessee, United States
|
|-
|Loss
|align=center|7–4 (1)
|Beau Tribolet
|TKO (punches)
|Superior Cage Combat 2
|
|align=center|1
|align=center|2:40
||Las Vegas, Nevada, United States
|
|-
|NC
|align=center|7–3 (1)
|Maurice Jackson
|NC
|Superior Cage Combat 1
|
|align=center|1
|align=center|2:59
|Las Vegas, Nevada, United States
|
|-
|Loss
|align=center|7–3
|Mike Whitehead
|TKO (punches)
|IFC: Extreme Challenge
|
|align=center|4
|align=center|4:34
|Mt. Pleasant, Michigan, United States
|
|-
|Win
|align=center|7–2
|Ryan Fortin
|Decision (unanimous)
|MFC 25: Vindication
|
|align=center|3
|align=center|5:00
|Edmonton, Alberta, Canada
|
|-
|Loss
|align=center|6–2
|Brendan Schaub
|TKO (punches)
|UFC Live: Vera vs. Jones
|
|align=center|1
|align=center|0:47
|Broomfield, Colorado, United States
|
|-
|Loss
|align=center|6–1
|Stefan Struve
|Submission (triangle choke)
|UFC 104
|
|align=center|1
|align=center|4:04
|Los Angeles, California, United States
|
|-
|Win
|align=center|6–0
|Eric Pele
|Decision (unanimous)
|MFC 16: Anger Management
|
|align=center|3
|align=center|5:00
|Edmonton, Alberta, Canada
|
|-
|Win
|align=center|5–0
|Rick Cheek
|Submission (Americana)
|GC 73: High Noon
|
|align=center|2
|align=center|2:20
||Sacramento, California, United States
|
|-
|Win
|align=center|4–0
|Brandon Tarns
|TKO (punches)
|GC 69: Bad Intentions
|
|align=center|1
|align=center|N/A
|Sacramento, California, United States
|
|-
|Win
|align=center|3–0
|Adolfo de la Torre
|TKO (strikes)
|COF 9: Durango
|
|align=center|1
|align=center|N/A
|N/A
|
|-
|Win
|align=center|2–0
|John Devine
|Submission (toe hold)
|GC 66: Battle Ground
|
|align=center|3
|align=center|N/A
|San Francisco, California, United States
|
|-
|Win
|align=center|1–0
|Jon Murphy
|Decision (unanimous)
|KOTC: Sinister
|
|align=center|2
|align=center|5:00
|San Jacinto, California, United States
|

References

External links
 
 

Living people
1983 births
American male mixed martial artists
Heavyweight mixed martial artists
Mixed martial artists utilizing collegiate wrestling
People from Torrance, California
Ultimate Fighting Championship male fighters
American male sport wrestlers